Sacatepéquez is one of the 22 departments of Guatemala. The name comes from Sacatepéquez, a city from November 21, 1542, until July 29, 1773, when it was destroyed by the 1773 Guatemalan Earthquake (Santa Marta Earthquake). Sacatepéquez means grasshill in the Nahuatl language. The capital of Sacatepéquez is Antigua Guatemala which is home to an extensive textile marketplace. Other important cities include Ciudad Vieja and San Lucas Sacatepéquez, which also hosts a marketplace and is a culinary attraction. The Chajoma were a group of indigenous people who were Kaqchikel speaking Indians identified Mixco Viejo as their capital, and spread throughout the Sacatepequez Department until their capital was moved to Ciudad Vieja, in Antigua.

Name

Sacatepéquez has also been spelled Zacatepeques.

Population

Sacatepéquez Department has a population of 330,469 (2018 census). In 1850, the area had a population of an estimated 56,000. The southern area, which is closer to Guatemala City, has the largest population.

Municipalities 

 Alotenango
 Antigua Guatemala
 Ciudad Vieja
 Jocotenango
 Magdalena Milpas Altas
 Pastores
 San Antonio Aguas Calientes
 San Bartolomé Milpas Altas
 San Lucas Sacatepéquez
 San Miguel Dueñas
 Santiago Sacatepéquez
 Santa Catarina Barahona
 Santa Lucía Milpas Altas
 Santa María de Jesús
 Santo Domingo Xenacoj
 Sumpango

Geography

The area is mountainous, with what the British described, in 1850, as a "mild climate." Guatemala hosts a chain of active and dormant volcanoes, with those in Sacatepequez including Acatenago, Volcan De Agua (Volcano of Water), and Volcan de Fuego (Volcano of Fire). Jocotes, a fruit of the cashew family, grow in the region.

Economy

The more populated areas produce fruit and various crops, including maize. Livestock is also raised, with trade going towards Guatemala City. The southern area of the department produces coffee, sugar, tobacco, and cotton. As of 1850, products were being shipped out of Iztapa. Although Guatemala is able to produce cash crops such as bananas and textiles, 72% of people living in rural areas live in poverty with 31% of them reaching extreme poverty.

See also
Chajoma

References

External links 
 

 
Departments of Guatemala